Professeur Punchline is the fourth studio album by French rapper Seth Gueko, it was released on November 6, 2015 by Believe Recordings.

Track list
"Gros dérapage" (4:00)
"Val d'Oseille" (3:55)
"Mr. l'agent" (4:36)
"Delicatessen" (3:46)
"Chintawaz" (feat. Gradur) (3:50)
"Seth Gueko Bar" (3:29)
"La meuf du moment" (feat. Misa) (3:06)
"Chantilly Nutella" (3:26)
"Comme on fait" (feat. Lacrim) (3:44)
"Les démons de Jésus" (3:16)
"Titi Parisien" (4:04)
"Homme des neiges" (feat. Niska) (4:03)
"Joey Starr RMX" (3:15)
"Ça fonctionne" (feat. Alkpote) (4:18)
"Gros gamin" (4:02)
"Boulette en métal" (feat. Sadek & Joke) (5:03)
"Paracétamol" (3:33)

Charts

References

2015 albums
French-language albums